is a Japanese animation studio. The company is headquartered in Tokyo, with chief offices in the Ginza district of Chūō and production facilities in Tama City.

Nippon Animation is known for producing numerous anime series based on works of Western literature such as Anne of Green Gables and The Adventures of Tom Sawyer. Hayao Miyazaki and Isao Takahata, co-founders of Studio Ghibli, directed several episodes in the World Masterpiece Theater series.

History
What is now Nippon Animation is descended from Zuiyo Eizo (or Zuiyo Enterprise), an animation studio founded in April 1969 by TCJ former manager Shigeto Takahashi. The studio produced several popular series in the early and mid-1970s, including 1974's Heidi, Girl of the Alps, an adaptation of Johanna Spyri's popular children's book Heidi. The Heidi anime was enormously popular in Japan (and later in Europe, and the feature-length edit of the TV series saw a U.S. VHS release in 1985). Zuiyo Eizo soon found itself in financial trouble because of the high production costs of a series (presumably Maya the Bee) it was attempting to sell to the European market.

In 1975, Zuiyo Eizo was split into two entities: Zuiyo, which absorbed the debt and the rights to the Heidi anime, and Nippon Animation, which was essentially Zuiyo Eizo's production staff (including Miyazaki and Takahata). Officially, Nippon Animation Co., Ltd. was established on 3 June 1975 by company president Kōichi Motohashi. The newly rechristened Nippon Animation found success right away with Maya the Bee and A Dog of Flanders (both of which began as Zuiyō Eizō productions), which became the first entry in the World Masterpiece Theater series to be produced under the Nippon Animation name. Hayao Miyazaki left Nippon Animation in 1979 in the middle of the production of Anne of Green Gables to make the Lupin III feature The Castle of Cagliostro.

Body of work
In addition to the World Masterpiece Theater series, Nippon Animation has also produced many other series based on Western works of literature, as well as original works and adaptations of Japanese manga. Especially, until Jeanie with the Light Brown Hair (1992), its peak of productions based on Western works of literature. Many of these are included in the list of the studio's works below.

Of the studio's productions not based on Western literature, the most popular is undoubtedly Chibi Maruko-chan (1990), based on the popular manga by Momoko Sakura. At its peak, this slice-of-life anime about an unusually intelligent elementary-school-aged girl and her family and friends managed an audience rating of nearly 40%, making it one of the highest-rated anime series ever (and the highest-rated anime program in Japanese history at the time).

Works adapted from Western literature

World Masterpiece Theater series

Other TV series

 Vicky the Viking (小さなバイキング ビッケ, Chiisana Viking Vikke) – 1974-75 (eps. 53-78, property of Zuiyo)

Maya the Honey Bee (みつばちマーヤの冒険, Mitsubachi Māya no Bōken) – 1975 (began as Zuiyo Eizo production) 
Laura, The Prairie Girl (草原の少女ローラ, Sōgen no shōjo Rōra (Laura, Girl of the Prairies)) – 1975
Arabian Nights: Sinbad's Adventures (Arabian Naitsu: Shinbaddo No Bôken) – 1975
The Adventures of Piccolino (Pikorīno no Bōken) – 1976
Little Lulu and Her Little Friends (Little Lulu to Chicchai Nakama) – 1976
Monarch: The Big Bear of Tallac (Kuma no Ko Jacky) – 1977
Future Boy Conan (Mirai Shonen Conan) – 1978, a Hayao Miyazaki work
Bannertail: The Story of Gray Squirrel (Seton Dobutsuki Risu no Banner) – 1979
Ruy, the Little Cid (Little El Cid no Bouken) – 1980, co-production with BRB Internacional 
Heart (Cuore): An Italian Schoolboy's Journal (Ai no Gakko Cuore Monogatari) – 1981
Dogtanian and the Three Muskehounds (Wanwan Sanjushi, The Three Musketeers) – 1981; co-production with BRB Internacional (Madrid, Spain)
The New Adventures of Maya the Bee (Shin Mitsubachi Maaya no Boken) – 1982 
Alice's Adventures in Wonderland (Fushigi no Kuni no Arisu) – 1983
Around the World with Willy Fog (Anime 80 Sekai Isshu) –  1983 (In Spain), 1987 (In Japan); co-production with BRB Internacional
Manga Aesop's Fables – 1983
Bosco Adventure (Bosco Daiboken) – 1986
Grimm's Fairy Tale Classics (Grimm Meisaku Gekijo/Shin Grimm Meisaku Gekijo) – 1987–1989
Jungle Book Shōnen Mowgli (2 October 1989 – 29 October 1990)
Jeanie with the Light Brown Hair (Kaze no Naka no Shojo Kinptasu no Jeannie) – 1992

TV specials
Manxmouse (Tondemo Nezumi Daikatsuyaku) (30 June 1979)
Anne's Diary: The Story of Anne Frank (Anne no Nikki: Anne Frank Monogatari) (28 September 1979)
Back to the Forest (Nodoka Mori no Dobutsu Daisakusen, English titles: Peter of Placid Forest, Back to the Forest) (3 February 1980)
The Story of Fifteen Boys (Hitomi no Naka no Shonen Jugo Shonen Hyoryuki) (19 October 1987)

Other works

TV series
Dokaben (6 October 1976 – 26 December 1979)
Attack on Tomorrow (4 April 1977 – 5 September 1977)
Blocker Gundan 4 Machine Blaster – 1977 (co-production with Ashi Productions)
Ginguiser (Chogattai Majutsu Robot Ginguiser) (co-production with Ashi Productions) – 1977
I'm Teppei (Ore wa Teppei) – 1977
Charlotte (Wakakusa no Charlotte) – 1977
The Casebook of Charlotte Holmes (Angie Girl, Jouo Heika no Petite Angie) – 1977
Poetry of the Baseball Enthusiasts (Yakyū-kyō no Uta) (23 December 1977 – 26 March 1979)
Haikara-san ga Tōru (Smart-san, Mademoiselle Anne) – 1978
Highschool Baseball Ninja (Ikkyu-san) – 1978
Misha the Bear Cub (Koguma no Misha) – 1979
Seton Dobutsuki Risu no Banner – 1979
Sanpei the Fisherman (Fisherman Sanpei) – 1980
Fútbol en acción – 1981 (co-production with Estudio Equip, BRB Internacional and Televisión Española)
The Many Dream Journeys of Meme – 1983 
Noozles (Fushigi na Koara Burinkii, Blinky and Printy) – 1984
Elves of the Forest (Mori no Tonto Tachi) – 1984 (co-production with Shaft)
Bumpety Boo (Hey! Bumboo) – 1985
Spaceship Sagittarius (Uchuusen Sagittarius) – 1986
Animated Classics of Japanese Literature (Seishun Anime Zenshū) (25 April 1986 – 26 December 1986 )
Topo Gigio – 1988
Dagon in the Land of Weeds – 1988
Chibi Maruko-chan – 1990
Pygmalio – 1990
Top Striker (Moero! Top Striker) – 1991
Christopher Columbus – 1992 co-production with Mondo TV
Mikan's Picture Diary (Mikan Enikki) – 1992
Papuwa-kun (Nangoku Shonen Papuwa-kun) – 1992
Bow: Modern Dog Tales (Heisei Inu Monogatari Bau) (14 October 1993 – 22 September 1994)
Dragon League – 1993
Muka Muka Paradise – 1993
Miracle Girls – 1993 (as Japan Taps)
Mahojin Guru Guru – 1994 
Pig Girl of Love and Courage: Tonde Burin – 1994
Yamato Takeru – 1994
 Romeo's Blue Skies – 1995
Mama Loves the Poyopoyo-Saurus – 1995
Grander Musashi – 1997
Duck Caen – 1997
Cooking Master Boy (Chūka Ichiban!) – 1997
Coji-Coji (Sakura Momoko Gekijo: Koji-Koji) – 1997; from the creator of Chibi Maruko-chan, Momoko Sakura
Ten-Ten-Kun (Hanasaki Tenshi Ten-Ten-kun) – 1998
Inventor Boy Kanipan (Hatsumei Boy Kanipan) – 1998
Xenon Football Sign – 1999
Shuukan! Story Land – 1999
Hunter × Hunter – 1999
Corrector Yui – 1999
Bikkuriman 2000 – 1999
Taiga Adventure (Mirai Shonen Conan II: Taiga no Daiboken) – 1999; a remake of Future Boy Conan directed by Hayao Miyazaki's former assistant, Keiji Hayakawa, but featuring a new cast of characters
Marcelino Pan y Vino – 2000 (Japan-Spain co-production; title is Spanish for "Marcelino, bread and wine")
Mahōjin Guru Guru – April 2000, TV Tokyo
Princess Comet (Cosmic Baton Girl Comet-san) – 2001; based on a manga by Mitsuteru Yokoyama, creator of Tetsujin 28-go and Sally, the Witch
Popee the Performer – 2001
Dennou Boukenki Webdiver – 2001 (co-production with Radix)
Daigunder – 2002 (co-production with Brains Base)
Hungry Heart: Wild Striker – 2002–2003, Animax
Papuwa – September 2003, TV Tokyo
Sore Ike! Zukkoke Sannin Gumi – April 2004, TV Tokyo
Fantastic Children – October 2004, TV Tokyo
Mix Master – 2005 (Japan-Korea co-production with Sunwoo Entertainment and KBS)
Pokapoka Mori no Rascal – 2006, Sequel of Araiguma Rascal 
Yamato Nadeshiko Shichi Henge – 2006
Antique Bakery – 2008
Hyakko – 2008
Hakushon Daimaō 2020 – 2020 (co-production with Tatsunoko Production)
Let's Make a Mug Too – 2021
Love All Play – 2022 (co-production with OLM)
Ao no Orchestra – 2023

Films
Future Boy Conan (Mirai Shōnen Konan) (15 September 1979)
Yakyū-kyō no Uta: Kita no Ōkami Minami no Tora (15 September 1979)
3000 Leagues in Search of Mother (19 July 1980)
Future Boy Conan: The Revival of the Giant Machine (Mirai Shōnen Konan: Tokubetsu Hen-Kyodaiki Gigant no Fukkatsu) (11 March 1984)
Locke the Superman (Chōjin Rokku) (14 April 1984)
Chibi Maruko-chan (15 December 1990)
Chibi Maruko-chan: Watashi no Suki na Uta (19 December 1992)
Tottoi (AKA "Secret of the Seal") (22 August 1992)
Heisei Inu Monogatari Bau: Genshi Inu Monogatari Bau (20 August 1994) – short film
Mahōjin Guru Guru – (20 April 1996) – short film
Violinist of Hameln (20 April 1996) – short film
The Dog of Flanders: The Movie (15 March 1997)
The Mighty Kong (16 June 1998) (Co-produced with L.A. Animation, Hahn Shin Corporation and Lana Productions)
Marco: 3000 Leagues in Search of Mother (2 April 1999)
The Tale of Princess Kaguya (2014) (Real production by Studio Ghibli, Nippon Animation was the animation cooperation with BONES, Tatsunoko Production and Studio 4°C)
Tensai Bakavon: Yomigaeru Flanders no Inu (23 May 2015)
Sinbad: Sora Tobu Hime to Himitsu no Shima – 2015
Chibi Maruko-chan: A Boy from Italy – 2015
Haikara-san ga Tōru Zenpen – Benio, Hana no 17-sai – 2017
Haikara-san ga Tōru Kōhen – Tokyo Dai Roman – 2018
Untitled film trilogy about Napoleon Bonaparte - 2024?
Untitled Princess Sara sequel film - ???

TV specialsKing Fang (Oyuki Yama no Yuusha Haou) (23 September 1978)Our Hit and Run (18 February 1979)Preface Taro (Maegami Taro) (29 April 1979)Coral Reef Legend: Elfie of the Blue Sea (Sango-shō Densetsu: Aoi Umi no Elfie) (22 August 1986)On-chan, Dream Power Big Adventure! (5 August 2003)Miyori's Forest (Miyori no Mori) (25 August 2007)

Original video animationsLocke the Superman: Lord Leon – 1989Bucchigiri – 1989Bucchigiri 2 – 1990Bucchigiri 3 – 1991Locke the Superman: New World Command – 1991Bucchigiri 4 – 1991Jungle Wars – 1991Boku wa Ō-sama – 1996Hunter x Hunter – 2002Shiritsu Araiso Koutougakkou Seitokai Shikkoubu – 2002Hunter x Hunter: Greed Island – 2003Pink Crayons – 2004Hunter x Hunter: G.I. Final – 2004

 Nippon Animedia 
It is a department of Nippon Animation that had a partnership with famous toy company Takara on some anime.Beyblade – 2001 (co-production with Madhouse)Beyblade: V-Force – 2002 (co-production with Madhouse)Beyblade: Fierce Battle – 2002Beyblade G Revolution – 2003 (co-production with Madhouse)B-Legend! Battle Bedaman – 2004Battle B-Daman: Fire Spirits – 2005Crash B-Daman – 2006Zero Duel Masters'' – 2007

References

External links

 

 
Animation studios in Tokyo
Animax
Mass media companies established in 1975
Japanese companies established in 1975
Japanese animation studios